Jimmy McGregor (born 31 May 1943) was a Scottish footballer who played for Stirling Albion, Dumbarton, East Stirling and Stenhousemuir.

References

1943 births
Scottish footballers
Dumbarton F.C. players
Stirling Albion F.C. players
East Stirlingshire F.C. players
Stenhousemuir F.C. players
Scottish Football League players
Living people
Association football midfielders